General Dudley may refer to:

Ambrose Dudley, 3rd Earl of Warwick (c. 1530–1590), English Army general
John H. Dudley (1907–1994), U.S. Army brigadier general
John Dudley, 1st Duke of Northumberland (1504–1553), English Army general
Robert Dudley, 1st Earl of Leicester (1532–1588), English Army captain general